John Johnston (11 April 1791, Knocknalling, near Dalry, Galloway – 24 November 1880) was a Scottish-American farmer. He is credited with the first public introduction of agricultural drainage in the United States. He did so in 1838.

John Johnston was born in Scotland and emigrated to the United States in 1821. His farmhouse in upper Geneva, New York is now a museum of his life and drainage tiles.

External links
 The Geneva Historical Society, which now owns and administrates his farmhouse as a museum
 Article on the subject, which is also given out in printed form during tours
 The Scottish-American History Club
 Local tourist board site on the museum

1791 births
1880 deaths
People from Dumfries and Galloway
People from Geneva, New York
Farmers from New York (state)
19th-century Scottish farmers
Scottish emigrants to the United States
Engineers from New York (state)